Apitz is a surname. Notable people with this surname include:

 Bruno Apitz (1900–1979), German writer and survivor of the Buchenwald concentration camp
 Laurie Apitz (1906–1980), American American football player and coach
 Willy Apitz, recipient of the Knight's Cross of the Iron Cross